Pan de Guajaibón is a mountain in the Guaniguanico range of western Cuba. It has two peaks, the highest of which is 699 metres above sea level. It is the  highest mountain in the Guaniguanico range.

A bust of Antonio Maceo Grajales is situated at the top of the mountain.

There are also cave systems at the mountain which contain archeological artifacts.

References

External links

Mountains of Cuba